is a Japanese footballer who playing as a right-back and currently play for Nankatsu SC of Kanto Soccer League.

Career statistics

Club
.

Notes

References

External links
Profile at Nankatsu SC

1997 births
Living people
Japanese footballers
Ryutsu Keizai University alumni
Association football defenders
J1 League players
J3 League players
Kashiwa Reysol players
Iwaki FC players
Yokohama FC players
YSCC Yokohama players
Nankatsu SC players